Leroi is surname of French origin, a variant spelling of Leroy which in French literally means "The King". It is used both as a given name, and as a surname.

As a given name
Leroi Court (born 1963), Australian athlete
Leroi Jones or Amiri Baraka (1934-2014), African-American writer
LeRoi Moore (1961-2008), American saxophonist

As a surname
Ali LeRoi (born 1962), American television producer, director, writer and actor
Armand Marie Leroi (born 1964), New Zealand author, broadcaster, and professor of evolutionary developmental biology
Gary LeRoi Gray (born 1987), American actor
André Leroi-Gourhan (1911-1986), French archaeologist, paleontologist, paleoanthropologist, and anthropologist

See also
Leroy (name)